is a 1979 Japanese film directed by Yasuo Furuhata. Inspired by Lockheed bribery scandals. Modeling on Kakuei Tanaka and Yoshio Kodama, the film depicts the collusion between Japanese right-wing organizations and the political and business world. Nagisa Oshima was due to direct this film.

Plot
Yamaoka is a fixer who made a man the prime minister of Japan, but he is being pursued for violating the Foreign Exchange Law and tax evasion in a fraudulent case involving the sale of aircraft. One day a boy tries to kill Yamaoka, but fails because Imaizumi stops him, and Yamaoka names him Koichi and makes him his subordinate.

Cast
Shin Saburi as Yamakuni (modeled after Yoshio Kodama)
Masakazu Tamura as Imaizumi
Kayo Matsuo as Masako Yamaoka
Kyoko Enami as Toshiko Yamaoka
Akira Nakao as Dan
Seizō Fukumoto as Nakahashi
Harumi Sone as Yutaka Ikeuchi
Junkichi Orimoto as Tsunuma
Ryunosuke Kaneda as Hirayama
Maki Tachibana as Kayoko Sawai
Masataka Iwao as Yuji Maejima
Etsushi Takahashi as Masao Kaga
Nenji Kobayashi as Shunsuke Mizumaki
Ichirō Nakatani as Yoshino
Kunie Tanaka as Tatsuo Ryuzaki
Noboru Nakaya as Suzumura
Ichirō Arishima as Heikichi Shibuya
Mikio Narita as Yasuzo Morishima
Chomei Soganoya as Tasuo Osanai(modeled after Kakuei Tanaka)
 Tatsuo Umemiya as Takayoshi Oguri

References

External links

Japanese drama films
1970s Japanese films